Oslofjord is the fjord leading up to Oslo, Norway.

Oslofjord may also refer to:

 Any of several ships operated by the Norwegian America Line:
 , a ship used by the Norwegian America Line, 1923–1930
 , an ocean liner operated by the Norwegian America Line, 1938–1940
 , a combined ocean liner/cruise ship operated by the Norwegian America Line, 1949–1967
 MS Oslofjord (1993), a passenger ferry operated by Fjord Line